Boza is a surname. Notable people with the name include:

 Benjamín Boza ( 1900–1901), Peruvian politician, mayor of Lima
 Francisco Boza (born 1964), Peruvian sports shooter
 Juan Boza (born 1941), Cuban artist
 Máximo Arrates Boza (1859-1936), Panamanian composer

See also
 Boza, fermented drink made from maize or wheat
Bolsover, nicknamed 'Boza'
 Boža Jovanović ( 1979–1982), Serbian rock drummer
 Boża Wola (disambiguation)
 Bozas, French commune
 Bosa (disambiguation)
 Buza (disambiguation)